Xiang Xiang (born June 14, 1984) is a Chinese singer. She was reportedly the most popular internet celebrity in China in 2005. Her birth name is Wang Jinmei.

She is perhaps most famous for her song "Song of Pig", the title track of her first solo album.

Xiang Xiang is also known for remaking the song, Mice Love Rice (老鼠爱大米; Lao Shu Ai Da Mi; by Yang Chengang), turning it into a hit on the Internet.

Discography

Albums 
 Song of Pig, February 2005
 Xiang Xiang Wang Lu Xiao Gong Zhu Ai Yo Ai Yo Dui Bu Qi, October 2005
 Sorry, October 2005
 Gong Zhu Ri Ji, December 2005
 Healthy Happy Action, May 2006
 Seam Love, June 2006
 Fate New + Best Selection

References

External links

 Profile at 21cn.com

1984 births
Living people
People from Changde
Chinese Mandopop singers
Singers from Hunan
21st-century Chinese women singers